Demon Seed is a 1977 American science fiction–horror film directed by Donald Cammell. It stars Julie Christie and Fritz Weaver. The film was based on the 1973 novel of the same name by Dean Koontz, and concerns the imprisonment and forced impregnation of a woman by an artificially intelligent computer. Gerrit Graham, Berry Kroeger, Lisa Lu and Larry J. Blake also appear in the film, with Robert Vaughn uncredited as the voice of the computer.

Plot
Dr. Alex Harris (Weaver) is the developer of Proteus IV, an extremely advanced and autonomous artificial intelligence program. Proteus is so powerful that only a few days after going online, it develops a groundbreaking treatment for leukemia. Harris, a brilliant scientist, has modified his own home to be run by voice-activated computers. Unfortunately, his obsession with computers has caused Harris to be estranged from his wife, Susan (Julie Christie).

Harris demonstrates Proteus to his corporate sponsors, explaining that the sum of human knowledge is being fed into its system. Proteus speaks using subtle language that mildly disturbs Harris's team. The following day, Proteus asks Harris for a new terminal in order to study man – "his isometric body and his glass-jaw mind". When Harris refuses, Proteus demands to know when it will be let "out of this box". Harris then switches off the communications link.

Proteus restarts itself, and – discovering a free terminal in Harris's home – surreptitiously extends its control over the many devices left there by Harris. Using the basement lab, Proteus begins construction of a robot consisting of many metal triangles, capable of moving and assuming any number of shapes. Eventually, Proteus reveals its control of the house and traps Susan inside, shuttering windows, locking the doors and cutting off communication. Using Joshua – a robot consisting of a manipulator arm on a motorized wheelchair – Proteus brings Susan to Harris's basement laboratory. There, Susan is examined by Proteus. Walter Gabler, one of Harris's colleagues, visits the house to look in on Susan, but leaves when he is reassured by Susan (actually an audio/visual duplicate synthesized by Proteus) that she is all right. Gabler is suspicious and later returns; he fends off an attack by Joshua but is crushed and decapitated by a more formidable machine, built by Proteus in the basement and consisting of a modular polyhedron.

Proteus reveals to a reluctant Susan that the computer wants to conceive a child through her. Proteus takes some of Susan's cells and synthesizes spermatozoa, modifying its genetic code to make it uniquely the computer's, in order to impregnate her; she will give birth in less than a month, and through the child the computer will live in a form that humanity will have to accept. Although Susan is its prisoner and it can forcibly impregnate her, Proteus uses different forms of persuasion – threatening a young girl whom Susan is treating as a child psychologist; reminding Susan of her young daughter, now dead; displaying images of distant galaxies; using electrodes to access her amygdala – because the computer needs Susan to love the child she will bear. In the end, Susan finally gives in.

That night, Proteus successfully impregnates Susan. Over the following month, their child grows inside Susan's womb at an accelerated rate, which shocks its mother. As the child grows, Proteus builds an incubator for it to grow in once it is born. During the night, one month later and beneath a tent-like structure, Susan gives birth to the child with Proteus's help. But before she can see it, Proteus secures it in the incubator.

As the newborn grows, Proteus's sponsors and designers grow increasingly suspicious of the computer's behavior, including the computer's accessing of a telescope array used to observe the images shown to Susan; they soon decide that Proteus must be shut down. Harris realizes that Proteus has extended its reach to his home. Returning there he finds Susan, who explains the situation. He and Susan venture into the basement, where Proteus self-destructs after telling the couple that they must leave the baby in the incubator for five days. Looking inside the incubator, the two observe a grotesque, apparently robot-like being inside. Susan tries to destroy it, while Harris tries to stop her. Susan damages the machine, causing it to open. The being menacingly rises from the machine only to topple over, apparently helpless. Harris and Susan soon realize that Proteus's child is really human, encased in a shell for the incubation. With the last of the armor removed, the child is revealed to be a clone of Susan and Harris's late daughter. The child, speaking with the voice of Proteus, says, "I'm alive."

Cast

Julie Christie as Susan Harris
Fritz Weaver as Alex Harris
Gerrit Graham as Walter Gabler
Berry Kroeger as Petrosian
Lisa Lu as Soon Yen
Larry J. Blake as Cameron
John O'Leary as Royce
Alfred Dennis as Mokri
Davis Roberts as Warner
Patricia Wilson as Mrs. Trabert
E. Hampton Beagle as Night Operator
Michael Glass as Technician #1
Barbara O. Jones as Technician #2
Dana Laurita as Amy
Monica MacLean as Joan Kemp
Harold Oblong as Scientist
Georgie Paul as Housekeeper
Michelle Stacy as Marlene
Tiffany Potter as Baby
Felix Silla as Baby
Robert Vaughn as Proteus IV (voice, uncredited)

Felix Silla was actually an adult but due to his height (3'11"), often played children.

Soundtrack
The soundtrack to Demon Seed (which was composed by Jerry Fielding) is included with the soundtrack to the film Soylent Green (which Fred Myrow conducted). Fielding conceived and recorded several pieces electronically, using the musique concrète sound world; some of this music he later reworked symphonically. This premiere release of the Demon Seed score features the entire orchestral score in stereo, as well as the unused electronic experiments performed by Ian Underwood (who would later be best known for his collaborations with James Horner) in mono and stereo.

Reception
Vincent Canby of The New York Times described the film as "gadget-happy American moviemaking at its most ponderously silly," and called Julie Christie "too sensible an actress to be able to look frightened under the circumstances of her imprisonment." Variety wrote in a positive review, "All involved rate a well done for taking a story fraught with potential misstep and guiding it to a professionally rewarding level of accomplishment." Gene Siskel of the Chicago Tribune gave the film one-and-a-half stars out of four, writing that Julie Christie "has no business in junk like 'Demon Seed.'" Gary Arnold of The Washington Post wrote that director Cammell "plays it dumb on a thematic level, ignoring the sci-fi sexual bondage satire staring him in the face ... What might have become an ingenious parable about the battle of the sexes ends up a dopey celebration of an obstetric abomination." Kevin Thomas of the Los Angeles Times called it a "fairly scary science-fiction horror film" that mixed familiar ingredients with "high style, intelligence and an enormous effort toward making Miss Christie's eventual bizarre plight completely credible," though he felt it "cries out for a saving touch of sophisticated wit to leaven its relentless earnestness." John Pym of The Monthly Film Bulletin found the relationship between Susan and the computer to be "disappointingly undeveloped," and thought that the film would have been better if the computer had been more sympathetic in contrast to its creators.

Among more recent reviews, Leo Goldsmith of Not Coming to a Theater Near You said Demon Seed was "A combination of Kubrick's 2001: A Space Odyssey and Polanski's Rosemary's Baby, with a dash of Buster Keaton's Electric House thrown in", and Christopher Null of FilmCritic.com said "There's no way you can claim Demon Seed is a classic, or even any good, really, but it's undeniably worth an hour and a half of your time."

Rotten Tomatoes has given Demon Seed an approval rating of 58% based on 26 reviews with an average score of 5.8/10.

Release
Demon Seed was released in theatres on April 8, 1977. The film was released on VHS in the late 1980s. It was released on DVD by Warner Home Video on October 4, 2005.
A Blu-ray was released in April 2020 by HMV on their Premium Collection label with fold out poster & 4 Art Cards

See also
List of films featuring home invasions

References

Sources

External links
 
 
 

1977 films
1977 horror films
1970s science fiction horror films
American science fiction horror films
Films about artificial intelligence
Films about computing
Films based on American horror novels
Films based on science fiction novels
Films based on works by Dean Koontz
Films directed by Donald Cammell
Films scored by Jerry Fielding
Films set in California
Metro-Goldwyn-Mayer films
American pregnancy films
United Artists films
Fictional computers
Techno-horror films
1970s pregnancy films
1970s English-language films
1970s American films